= Kampung Bukit Kuda =

Village in Malaysia

Coordinates: 5°20′22″N 115°13′25″E

Kampung Bukit Kuda is a village in Federal Territory of Labuan, Malaysia.
